Torbay is a constituency in Devon represented in the House of Commons of the UK Parliament since 2015 by Kevin Foster, a Conservative. He defeated Adrian Sanders of the Liberal Democrats, who had held the seat since 1997.

Boundaries	
1974–1983: The County Borough of Torbay.

1983–2010: The Borough of Torbay wards of Cockington with Chelston, Coverdale, Ellacombe, Preston, St Marychurch, St Michael's with Goodrington, Shiphay, Tormohun, and Torwood.

2010–present: The Borough of Torbay wards of Clifton with Maidenway, Cockington with Chelston, Ellacombe, Goodrington with Roselands, Preston, Roundham with Hyde, St Marychurch, Shiphay with the Willows, Tormohun, Watcombe, and Wellswood.

The constituency covers the majority of the Torbay unitary authority in Devon, including the seaside resorts of Torquay and most of Paignton.  The remainder of the borough is covered by the Totnes constituency.

History

Political history
After being held for several Parliaments (taking together various predecessor areas) by Conservatives, from 1997 the seat was held by Liberal Democrats until 2015 when a Conservative re-took it.

Prominent frontbenchers
Sir Frederic Bennett did not achieve his own ministry nationally, but he chaired in the European Parliament the European Democrats group.

Constituency profile
Consisting almost entirely of coastal towns and villages, the constituency has a range of shopping, tourist and visitor facilities from Paignton Zoo, safe bathing and boating to mini-golf, as well as a few nearby luxury resorts.  Perhaps owing to the seasonal rise in employment, workless claimants, registered jobseekers, were in November 2012 significantly higher than the national average of 3.8%, at 5.0% of the population based on a statistical compilation by The Guardian.

The seat is home to the Plainmoor football ground, home to Torquay United. Past MP Adrian Sanders is a notable supporter of the football club.

Members of Parliament

Elections

Elections in the 2010s

Elections in the 2000s

Elections in the 1990s

The 12 vote majority in Torbay was originally the second smallest in any of the 659 constituencies contested at the 1997 general election, with only the Liberal Democrats' majority of 2 in Winchester being smaller. However the Winchester result was subsequently challenged and declared void resulting in a by-election.

Elections in the 1980s

Elections in the 1970s

See also
 List of parliamentary constituencies in Devon

Notes

References

Parliamentary constituencies in Devon
Torbay
Constituencies of the Parliament of the United Kingdom established in 1974